Bogdan Stojković (born 14 October 2002) is a Serbian footballer who plays as a midfielder for Hajduk Veljko Negotin on loan from Radnik Surdulica.

Career statistics

Club

Notes

References

2002 births
Living people
Serbian footballers
Association football midfielders
Serbian SuperLiga players
FK Radnik Surdulica players